Christos Koukolis (born 26 April 1990) is a Greek professional footballer who plays as a centre-back for Super League 2 club Pierikos.

References

1990 births
Living people
Greek footballers
Super League Greece players
Football League (Greece) players
Super League Greece 2 players
Gamma Ethniki players
Veria F.C. players
Panserraikos F.C. players
Agrotikos Asteras F.C. players
PAS Lamia 1964 players
Iraklis Thessaloniki F.C. players
Doxa Drama F.C. players
Association football defenders
Footballers from Veria